Juan del Grijalva is a small village (approx. 416 inhabitants ) in the Mexican state of Chiapas. It is part of the Municipality of Ostuacán and is located in the north end of the state on the banks of the Grijalva River, between the Peñitas Dam and the Malpaso Dam.

On November 5, 2007 a landslide from an adjacent  hill fell on the Grijalva River, causing a wave of 50 meters of height that struck the town and destroyed all its buildings.

17°21′51″N, 93°23′00″W

External links
Mudslide adds to Mexico flood woes (BBC News)
In pictures: Mexico landslide (BBC News)
En Chiapas, una ola de 50 metros arrasa un pueblo (Milenio)

Populated places in Chiapas